Muricopsis (Muricopsis) cristata, common name Blainville's muricop, is a species of sea snail, a marine gastropod mollusk in the family Muricidae, the murex snails or rock snails.

Synonyms

 Fusus asperrimus Millet, 1865 (junior homonym of Fusus asperrimus T. Brown, 1827)
 Fusus dodecanesinus Bevilacqua, 1928
 Murex blainvillei Payraudeau, 1826
 Murex blainvillei var. aterrima Dautzenberg, 1890
 Murex blainvillei var. bicolor Monterosato, 1878
 Murex blainvillei var. gracilis Monterosato in Bucquoy, Dautzenberg & Dollfus, 1882
 Murex blainvillei var. gracilis Monterosato, 1870
 Murex blainvillei var. minor Praus, 1906
 Murex blainvillei var. rosea Monterosato, 1878 in Bucquoy, Dautzenberg & Dollfus, 1882
 Murex blainvillei var. trophoniformis Monterosato, 1884
 Murex blainvillei var. violacea Monterosato, in Bucquoy, Dautzenberg & Dollfus, 1882
 Murex blainvillii Payraudeau, 1826 
 Murex blainvillii var. bicolor Monterosato, 1878 
 Murex cataphractus Sowerby, 1834
 Murex cinosurus Chiereghini in Nardo, 1847
 Murex cristatus Brocchi, 1814 (basionym)
 Murex cristatus var. adellus de Gregorio, 1885
 Murex cristatus var. ampa de Gregorio, 1885 
 Murex cristatus var. ampus de Gregorio, 1885
 Murex cristatus var. berdica de Gregorio, 1885 (synonym)
 Murex cristatus var. berdicus de Gregorio, 1885
 Murex cristatus var. emus de Gregorio, 1885
 Murex cristatus var. expallescens Tapparone Canefri, 1869 
 Murex cristatus var. inermis Philippi, 1836
 Murex dentatus Anton, 1838 
 Murex inermis Philippi, 1836
 Murex inermis trifasciata Nordsieck, 1972
 Murex pliciferus Bivona-Bernardi, 1832
 Murex porrectus Locard, 1886
 Murex pustulatus Locard, 1899 
 Murex rudis Risso, 1826
 Murex rugulosa O.G. Costa, 1861
 Murex subspinosus A. Adams, 1854
 Muricidea blainvillei [sic] (misspelling of Muricidea blainvillii (Payraudeau, 1826))
 Muricidea blainvillei var. trophoniformis Weinkauff, 1868)
 Muricidea polliaeformis Weinkauff, 1868 
 Muricopsis (Muricopsis) cristata (Brocchi, 1814)· accepted, alternate representation
 Muricopsis atra Nordsieck, 1972
 Muricopsis blainvillei (Payraudeau, 1826)
 Muricopsis blainvillei var. hispida Coen, 1933
 Muricopsis blainvillei var. horrida Monterosato in Coen, 1933
  Muricopsis blainvillei var. oblonga Stalio in Coen, 1933
 Muricopsis blainvillei var. rosea Bucquoy, Dautzenberg & Dollfus, 1882
 Muricopsis blainvillei var. spinulata Coen, 1937 
 Muricopsis blainvillei var. spinulosa Coen, 1933 
 Muricopsis blainvillei var. spinulosa Stalio in Coen, 1933
 Muricopsis blainvillei var. umbilicata Coen, 1930
 Muricopsis blainvillei var. violacea Bucquoy, Dautzenberg & Dollfus, 1882 
 Muricopsis blainvillii (Payraudeau, 1826)
 Muricopsis blainvillii var. horrida Monterosato in Coen, 1933 
 Muricopsis blainvillii var. oblonga Stalio in Coen, 1933 
 Muricopsis blainvillii var. spinulosa Stalio in Coen, 1933 
 Muricopsis cristatus (Brocchi, 1814)
 Muricopsis cristatus major Settepassi, 1977
 Muricopsis cristatus pungens Monterosato in Settepassi, 1977
 Muricopsis cristatus spinulatus Stalio in Settepassi, 1977
 Muricopsis glutinosa Palazzi & Villari, 2001 (dubious synonym)
 Muricopsis hispida Monterosato in Coen, 1933
 Muricopsis inermis (Philippi, 1836)
 Muricopsis inermis trifasciata Nordsieck, 1972 
 Muricopsis spinulosa Stalio in Coen, 1933
 Muricopsis spinulosa obsoleta Nordsieck, 1972
 Ocinebra blainvillei [sic] (misspelling of Ocinebra blainvillii (Payraudeau, 1826))
 Ocinebra blainvillei var. elongata Locard & Caziot, 1900 
 Ocinebra blainvillei var. ventricosa Locard & Caziot, 1900 
 Ocinebrina blainvillei (Payraudeau, 1826)
 Ocinebrina blainvillei var. hirsuta Pallary, 1904
 Ocinebrina blainvillii (Payraudeau, 1826)
 Pollia coccinea Monterosato, 1884 (dubious synonym)

Fossil records
The fossil record dates back to the Pliocene (age range: from 3.6 to 2.588 million years ago).

Description
The shell size varies between 10 mm and 35 mm. Size, color and morphology are very variable. The whorls have a variable number of more or less prominent varices showing foliaceous or spinose projections. They have a well-developed siphonal canal, and the siphon is quite elongated.

Distribution
This quite common species ioccurs in the Mediterranean Sea, in the Atlantic Ocean off Portugal, Morocco and the Canaries and in the Red Sea.

References

 Nordsieck, F. (1972). Marine Gastropoden aus der Shiqmona-Bucht in Israël. Archiv für Molluskenkunde der Senckenbergischen Naturforschenden Gesellschaft. 102(4–6): 227–245. 
 Palazzi, S.; Villari, A. (2001). Molluschi e Brachiopodi delle grotte sottomarine del Taorminense. La Conchiglia. 297, suppl., 56 pp
 Nordsieck, F. (1972). Marine Gastropoden aus der Shiqmona-Bucht in Israël. Archiv für Molluskenkunde der Senckenbergischen Naturforschenden Gesellschaft. 102(4–6): 227–245. 
 Coen G. (1933). Saggio di una Sylloge Molluscorum Adriaticorum. Memorie del Regio Comitato Talassografico Italiano 192: pp. i-vii, 1–186
 Ceulemans L., van Dingenen F., Merle D. & Landau B.M. (2016). The lower Pliocene gastropods of Le Pigeon Blanc (Loire-Atlantique, northwest France). Part 3) – Muricidae. Vita Malacologica. 15: 35–55.
 Landau B.M., Merle D., Ceulemans L. & Van Dingenen F. (2019). The upper Miocene gastropods of northwestern France, 3. Muricidae. Cainozoic Research. 19(1): 3–44.

External links
 Brocchi G.B. (1814). Conchiologia fossile subapennina con osservazioni geologiche sugli Apennini e sul suolo adiacente. Milano. Vol. 1: i-lxxx, 1–56, 1-240; vol. 2: 241–712, 16 pls
 Nardo, Giovanni Domenico. (1847). Sinonimia moderna delle specie regisrate nell'opera intitolati: descrizione d'crostacei, de testacei e de pesci che abitano le lagune e golfo veneto rappres- sentanti in figure, a chiaroscuro ed a colori dall' Abata Stefano Chiereghini: Venezia, Ven. Clodiense applicata per commissione governativa dal Dr. Gio. Domenico Nardo
 Philippi R. A. (1836). Enumeratio molluscorum Siciliae cum viventium tum in tellure tertiaria fossilium, quae in itinere suo observavit. Vol. 1. Schropp, Berlin [Berolini]: xiv + 267 p., pl. 1–12
 Bivona-Bernardi Ant. (1832). Caratteri di alcune nuove specie di conchiglie. Effemeride Scientifiche e Letterarie per la Sicilia 2: 16, pl. 2 
 Locard A. (1886). Prodrome de malacologie française. Catalogue général des mollusques vivants de France. Mollusque marins. Lyon, H. Georg & Paris, Baillière : pp. X + 778,
 Risso, A. (1826–1827). Histoire naturelle des principales productions de l'Europe Méridionale et particulièrement de celles des environs de Nice et des Alpes Maritimes. Paris, Levrault:. . 3(XVI): 1–480, 14 pls.
  Adams A. (1854 ["1853"]). Descriptions of new shells from the collection of Hugh Cuming, Esq. Proceedings of the Zoological Society of London. 21: 69–74.
 Pallary P. (1904–1906). Addition à la faune malacologique du Golfe de Gabès. Journal de Conchyliologie. 52: 212–248, pl. 7 [1904; 54: 77–124, pl. 4 []
 Payraudeau B. C. (1826). Catalogue descriptif et méthodique des Annelides et des Mollusques de l'île de Corse. Paris, 218 pp. + 8 pl
 Sowerby I, G. B. & Sowerby II, G. B. (1832–1841). The conchological illustrations or, Coloured figures of all the hitherto unfigured recent shells. London, privately published.
  Anton H.E. (1838 ["1839"). Verzeichniss der Conchylien welche sich in der Sammlung von Herrmann Eduard Anton befinden. Herausgegeben von dem Besitzer. Halle: Anton. xvi + 110 pp. [Title page dated 1839, but volume actually published in 1838; see Cernohorsky, 1978, The Veliger 20(3): 299.]
 Weinkauff H. C. (1867–1868). Die Conchylien des Mittelmeeres, ihre geographische und geologisches Verbreitung. T. Fischer, Cassel Vol. 1: pp. XIX + 307 [1867]. Vol. 2: pp. VI + 512. [1868]  
 Monterosato T. A. (di) (1884). Nomenclatura generica e specifica di alcune conchiglie mediterranee. Palermo, Virzi, 152 p
  Bucquoy E., Dautzenberg P. & Dollfus G. (1882–1886). Les mollusques marins du Roussillon. Tome Ier. Gastropodes. Paris: Baillière & fils. 570 pp., 66 pls. [pp. 1–40, pls 1–5, February 1882; pp. 41–84, pls 6–10, August 1882; pp. 85–135, pls 11–15, February 1883; pp. 136–196, pls 16–20, August 1883; pp. 197–222, pls 21–25, January 1884; pp. 223–258, pls 26–30, February 1884; pp. 259–298, pls 31–35, August 1884; pp. 299–342, pls 36–40, September 1884; pp. 343–386, pls 41–45, February 1885; pp. 387–418, pls 46–50, August 1885; pp. 419–454, pls 51–60, January 1886; pp. 455–486, pls 56–60, April 1886; pp. 487–570, pls 61–66, October 1886 
 Locard A. & Caziot E. (1900–1901). Les coquilles marines des côtes de Corse. Annales de la Société Linnéenne de Lyon, 46: 193–274 [1900]; 47: 1–80, 159–291 [1901] 
 Muricopsis cristata - Biodiversity Heritage Library - Bibliography
 Muricopsis cristata - NCBI Taxonomy Database
 Muricopsis cristata - Global Biodiversity Information Facility
 Muricopsis cristata - Encyclopedia of Life

Muricidae
Gastropods described in 1814